Kvaløysletta is an urban neighborhood within the city of Tromsø which is part of Tromsø Municipality in Troms og Finnmark county, Norway. The residential area is located just across the Sandnessund Bridge from the island of Tromsøya where the city centre is located.

This was a rural area with just a few farms along the shoreline until the opening of the Sandnessund Bridge in 1974. Since then, the area has grown rapidly, and now includes several schools, kindergartens, shops, and restaurants.  The built-up areas have now grown so far south-west that it now extends seamlessly into the next settlement, Kaldfjord.

References

Villages in Troms
Tromsø
Populated places of Arctic Norway